Lääniste Ahijärv is a lake in Kastre Parish, Tartu County, Estonia.

See also
List of lakes of Estonia

References

Kastre Parish
Lakes of Tartu County